Alexis "Lexi" Missimo (born January 30, 2003) is an American soccer player who plays for the U.S. Youth National Teams and the University of Texas. She was the number one recruit for the class of 2021, but elected to graduate early and enrolled at Texas in the fall of 2020.

She was listed as number four on the goal.com NXGN 2021: The 10 best wonderkids in women's football and repeated as number four on the goal.com NXGN 2022: The 20 best wonderkids in women's football.

Missimo has been part of the U.S. Youth National Team program since March 2016 with the U14 Girls National Team. She played for every U.S. Youth National Team. She was part of the 2022 USA U20 Women's National Team that won the 2022 Concacaf Championship. Missimo was named to the Best XI at the 2022 Concacaf U20 Women's Championship.

Club career 
During her club career, she played for Solar Soccer Club (Dallas, Texas). She scored 100 goals in 62 games the Girls Development Academy between 2017 and 2019. Missimo was part of the Solar U16/U17 team that won the 2019 Girls Development Academy National Championship. She was awarded the Golden Boot at the Girls Development Academy Playoffs with 11 goals. She was the Girls Development Academy Player of the Year for the Central Region for that season. She was named to the U.S. Soccer Development Academy Best XI for the U18/19 Central Conference for the 2018 season.

Previously, Missimo played on the Solar U18/19 team in the Girls Development Academy during the 2017/2018 season while playing up four age groups. She was the leading scorer on that team that advanced to the national championship game. Her Solar team also advanced to the national championship in the ECNL at the U15 age group during the 2016/2017 season. She won the US Youth Soccer National Championship at the U13 level in 2016 with her Solar Chelsea 03 team.

She was a two-time NSCAA All-American (2018–2019) at the youth level.

Youth National Team career 
Missimo made her first appearance with the U.S. Youth National Team in 2016 with the U14 Girls National Team. She made her international debut at the youth level on May 12, 2017, with the U.S. U16 Girls National Team in a 4–0 win over Croatia. She also played in wins over Belgium and Switzerland during the U16 Development Tournament. Missimo scored her first international goal at the youth level in U.S. U15 Girls National Team's 3–2 win over Germany on November 1, 2017.

Part of the U.S. U16 Girls National Team, she won the 2018 Torneo delle Nazioni. Missimo was the leading scorer at the event with five goals, tied with club teammate Trinity Byars for the honor.

She was part of the U.S. U17 Women's National Team during the lead-up to the 2018 U-17 World Cup, while playing up two age groups. She started in the 4–4 draw against Korea Republic on August 18, 2018, one of the final events before the event. Ultimately, she did not make the roster for the World Cup.

Missimo was a key player for the U.S. squad during the build-up to the 2020 U-17 World Cup. She scored three goals and had two assists during two tournaments in Europe in 2019. She had both assists in the 2–0 win over England in Florida on February 22, 2020, which was the final game for the team before the qualifying event. However, the World Cup and the Concacaf Women's U-17 Championship were canceled due to the covid pandemic.

Missimo was named to the U.S. U20 Women's National Team for the Concacaf U20 Women's Championship in 2022. She scored three goals in seven appearances while leading USA to the championship at the regional event. Missimo was one of four players from USA to make the Best XI for the 2022 Concacaf U20 Women's Championship.

Prior to the 2022 FIFA U-20 Women's World Cup, Missimo announced on social media that she removed herself for consideration for the roster to focus on her sophomore season with the Texas Longhorns.

US Soccer called Missimo back into the Youth National Team at the U23 age group in Feb. of 2023 for a camp in France.

College career 
Missimo verbally committed to Texas while she was in the seventh grade. She graduated from Southlake Carroll High School in three years in 2020 and enrolled at the University of Texas in the fall of that year. She scored a goal in her college debut on March 5, 2021, a 4–0 win over Texas State. She scored two goals in a 4–0 win over Baylor on March 31, 2021. She finished the abbreviated spring season with eight points, three goals, and two assists in three games.

Missimo started all 22 games during her freshman fall season. She played 2,028 of a possible 2,113 for the Longhorns. She finished her debut fall season with nine goals and 14 assists. She led the Big 12 Conference and tied the Texas soccer program-record for assists in a season. She was named the 2021 Big 12 Conference Freshman of the Year. She was also named to the 2021 All-Big 12 Conference First Team, the 2021 Big 12 All-Tournament Team, and the 2021 Big 12 Conference All-Freshman Team. She was the only freshman included in the 2021 United Soccer Coaches All-Midwest Region First Team.

During her sophomore season, Missimo played in 17 games after suffering an injury early in the season that forced her to miss six games. Despite the absence, she led the Big-12 conference and set the Texas program record for assist in a season with 15, which ranked third in NCAA Division I for the 2022 season. Texas won the Big 12 regular season Championship and finished as semifinalist in the conference tournament. Missimo contributed an assist in the Longhorns' First Round NCAA Tournament win over Texas A&M. The 2022 season came to an end in a 0-1 loss against Duke in the Second Round of the NCAA Tournament.

Professional career 
Missimo told the Dallas Morning News in May 2020 that Manchester City and Arsenal "have pro opportunities waiting for her if she decides to go that route." She previously trained with Manchester City.

Former U.S. Men's National Team defender Eddie Pope, the Director of North American soccer for Octagon, has served as an advisor for Missimo.

Personal 
Her parents are Derek Missimo and Susan Missimo. Derek is the all-time leading scorer (56) and all-time points leader (138) for North Carolina. Derek coached Alexis Missimo's youth club teams. Susan Missimo was a four-year letter winner for Texas Christian women's soccer from 1991 to 1994. Alexis Missimo has one sibling, her older sister Gabriella, who was part of the Texas Longhorns women's soccer team in 2019.

References 

2003 births
Living people
Texas Longhorns women's soccer players
Soccer players from Texas
People from Grapevine, Texas
American women's soccer players
Women's association football midfielders
United States women's under-20 international soccer players